Gürleyik Waterfall is a waterfall at Gürleyik village of Mihalıcçık ilçe (district) in Eskişehir Province, Turkey. A camp site and picnic area are also situated around the waterfall.

The visitors from Ankara follow the Turkish state highway D-140 and the local road to the south. The admission fee  is  10. The visitors can swim in the pond of the waterfall.

References

Landforms of Eskişehir Province
Mıhalıcçık District
Waterfalls of Turkey